Dennis C. McCoy is a former American politician who served in the Maryland House of Delegates and was the chairman of the Baltimore City Delegation.

Background
McCoy attended Baltimore parochial schools and received a BS at University of Maryland in 1965. Three years later he graduated from the University of Baltimore School of Law with a J.D.  In 1973 he earned an MBA from Loyola College.  McCoy Was admitted to the Maryland Bar in 1968.

In the legislature

McCoy was first elected to the Maryland House of Delegates in 1974 and represented Legislative District 44 (D), Baltimore City until 1986.  He was a member of the Ways and Means Committee, the Special Joint Committee on Transportation and chaired the Joint Committee on Clerks of Court. McCoy was also chairman of the Baltimore City Delegation from 1979 to 1986.

Past general election results
1982 Race for Maryland House of Delegates – 44th District
Voters to choose three:
{| class="wikitable"
|-
!Name
!Votes
!Percent
!Outcome
|- 
|Curt Anderson, Democratic
|17,692
|  30.4%
|   Won
|- 
|Anne S. Perkins, Democratic
|16,765 
|  29.5%
|   Won
|- 
|Dennis C. McCoy, Democratic
|16,687
|  29.0%
|   Won
|- 
|A. Hairston, Republican
|2,528 
|  4.4%
|   Lost
|- 
|Benjamin Jones, Republican
|2,390
|  3.9%
|   Lost
|- 
|Armstead Jones, Republican
|2,281 
|  3.3%
|   Lost
|}

Notes

Members of the Maryland House of Delegates
Politicians from Baltimore
1942 births
Living people
People from Owings Mills, Maryland